Dmitriyevka is a rural locality (a village) in Nikolayevsky Selsoviet, Blagoveshchensky District, Bashkortostan, Russia. The population was 343 as of 2010. There are 34 streets.

Geography 
Dmitriyevka is located 9 km northwest of Blagoveshchensk (the district's administrative centre) by road. Nikolayevka is the nearest rural locality.

References 

Rural localities in Blagoveshchensky District